Sean Patrick Reiley (born June 15, 1976), better known as Seanbaby, is an American writer and video-game designer best known for his comedy website and frequent contributions to video game media outlets Electronic Gaming Monthly and 1UP.com, as well as the humor website Cracked.com.

Writing career
Seanbaby's original website houses many reviews of old video games, a substantial section on the old Super-Friends cartoon, critiques on old DC comics, a collection of Hostess Pie ads (with commentary), sarcastic commentary on Christian fundamentalists and hipsters, examples of poorly translated English, reviews of bad movies and comics, ineffective or overblown self-defense techniques, current events, and a photo gallery of himself with friends.

Seanbaby was a frequent writer for Electronic Gaming Monthly. In addition to his reviews and other content, he wrote a monthly column concerning bad games entitled "Rest of The Crap." He was a frequent contributor on the popular gaming website 1UP.com, where his EGM work was posted. He provides commentary on bad games for 1UP's Broken Pixels show. He also writes a column called "The Final Last Word" for The Wave magazine of Silicon Valley.

He was also a writer for the short-lived MTV2 animated comedy show The Adventures of Chico and Guapo. He has returned to regularly updating seanbaby.com and began writing as a columnist for Cracked.com. Apart from the typical "listicles" of Cracked.com, Seanbaby's articles also include parodical comics, usually golden-age comicbooks with altered dialogue, and the running gag of 1930's ice-cream mascot "Popsicle Pete" being characterized as a supernatural monster. In 2020, he and fellow Cracked veteran Robert Brockway began publishing comedy articles on the Patreon-supported 1-900-HOTDOG where they also produce a weekly podcast, the Dogg Zzone 9000.

Calculords

Seanbaby is the creator of the mobile game Calculords, which combines elements of lane attack, collectible card games, and math puzzles. According to Sean, "Calculords is a weird idea that I’d never get to see unless I made it".

A sequel, Calculords 2: Rise of the Shadow Nerd, has been announced.

Filmography

Radio
The ATHENA Superpower Hour: KUOI 89.3 FM; Moscow, Idaho; 1998 (co-host)

Television appearances
Electronic Gaming Monthly Special: The 15 Best Games of the Millennium and Their Sequels, MTV (host)
Video Game Vixens, G4 (judge)
Attack of the Show, G4 (guest host)
G4tv.com, G4 (guest host)
Top Ten Best and Worst Videogames, MTV (guest)

See also
Daniel O'Brien
Michael Swaim
David Wong
Kittenpants

References

External links

Seanbaby on Cracked.com

Seanbaby's "Rest of the Crap" Archive
1900hotdog.com

1976 births
Living people
American Internet celebrities
American comedy websites
American critics
American video game designers
Video game critics
University of Idaho alumni
Place of birth missing (living people)